Baana is a former railway, which has been transformed into a pedestrian and cycling path as an urban renewal project in Helsinki, replacing the Helsinki harbour railway. Its length is about 1.3 kilometers (0.81 mi), starting from Kiasma. It is used annually by approximately 700 000 cyclists.

History
There were three plans to convert the railway cutting left behind by the disused Helsinki harbour rail to a new use. Of the three plans, the bicycle and pedestrian alternative prevailed in the end. The modification to bike and pedestrian use took several years. The name Baana (Finnish slang word for (rail)way coming from Swedish bana and German Bahn) for the new route was obtained through a naming competition. Baana was opened to the public on Helsinki Day, 12 June 2012. 

Baana begins between Helsinki Music Centre and Kiasma. There are several staircase exits for pedestrians and a sloped exit for bikes. The pedestrian lane has chairs fixed to asphalt. In the wide part near Ruoholahdenkatu sports-related facilities have been provided for skateboarding and table tennis.

Baana provides a speedy way to bike through western Helsinki downtown and adds to non-commercial space in heart of downtown. It has been very popular especially during prime biking season. There is a bike counter which shows bike count for today and for this year. It can also be viewed online. Baana chasm has been used for performances during annual festival Night of the Arts.

Baana received a special mention in European Prize for Urban Public Space competition in 2014. The name Baana has later been put for a wider use to describe multiple different cycling paths (such as Pohjoisbaana in north-south direction) and also the cycling network (Baanaverkko) as a whole.

References

External links
 

Kluuvi
Kamppi
Transport in Helsinki
Urban renewal